The Silver Lining (Chinese: 骤雨骄阳) is a Singaporean Chinese drama series. The series stars Lina Ng, Zheng Geping, Margaret Lee, Pan Lingling, Chen Shucheng, Li Yinzhu, Zeng Sipei, Fu Youming, Anna Chen and Weng Ruiyun.

Cast
Lina Ng
Zheng Geping

Margaret Lee
Pan Lingling
Chen Shucheng
Li Yinzhu
Zeng Sipei
Fu Youming
Anna Chen
Weng Ruiyun
Richard Low

Reception
The series received a positive review in the Lianhe Zaobao.

References

1990s Singaporean television series